The Kennesaw State Owls football represents Kennesaw State University in college football. The team began play in 2015 as a member of the Big South Conference at the NCAA Division I Football Championship Subdivision level. In 2022, KSU's full-time home of the ASUN Conference launched an FCS football league, with KSU as one of its initial six members. After the 2022 season, KSU will start a transition to the Football Bowl Subdivision in advance of the school's 2024 move to Conference USA.

The head coach of the Owls is Brian Bohannon, and the Owls play at Fifth Third Bank Stadium in Kennesaw, Georgia.

History

Planning stages (2007–2009)
Kennesaw State had considered adding a football team at various points in its history. The school had concluded a feasibility survey which affirmed it would be possible to have Division I football. On November 9, 2007, a survey was administered by the Student Government with 77.6 percent of respondents voting in favor of starting a football program.  Participation in the survey was supposed to be restricted to enrolled students only; however, due to a design flaw, anyone could take the survey an unlimited number of times.

Building stages (2009–2013)
In December 2009, KSU President Daniel S. Papp appointed a football exploratory committee headed by legendary University of Georgia coach, Vince Dooley. The committee announced a highly favorable recommendation for the creation of a football program at KSU in a 137-page report on September 15, 2010 in a press conference at the KSU Convocation Center.

KSU athletic director Vaughn Williams stated that KSU was targeting fielding a team for the 2014 season playing at the Football Championship Subdivision (FCS) level formerly known as I-AA. KSU presented its plans for the football program to the State Board of Regents on February 13, 2013, and on February 14, KSU officially announced that the State Board of Regents had accepted their proposal for the football team. The school started the football program with the 2015 season.

KSU is currently affiliated with the ASUN Conference for sports but since that conference does not sponsor football, the school would have to either play as an independent or find a new conference to join, either for all sports or as a football associate. On September 3, 2013, KSU announced that it will be joining the Big South Conference as a football-only member to begin play in the 2015 season. In 2016, the Atlantic Sun and Big South agreed to an alliance between the two conferences where football-playing schools in both conferences will be part of one Big South conference for the sport. North Alabama, which will join the Atlantic Sun, will become the second such school in the Atlantic Sun under this alliance.

Brian Bohannon is the first football coach at Kennesaw State.

The start – 2015 season 
The program began playing games in the fall of 2015, with a 56–16 win against East Tennessee State University. The Owls finished the season 6–5 (2–4 in the Big South).

Early success – 2017 and 2018 
In the program's fourth year of existence (third season played, as the 2014 season was practice only and every player took a red shirt) the Owls won the 2017 Big South Championship, going 5–0 in conference play. Kennesaw State received the conference's automatic bid to the FCS Playoffs in both those seasons, in 2017 as an unseeded team the Owls hosted Samford in a rematch of the season opener, Kennesaw avenged the early season loss and went on the next week to upset the 3rd ranked Jacksonville State Gamecocks. At the time that was by far the best win in program history. After the huge win the Owls traveled to 6th ranked Sam Houston State for the quarterfinals, the Owls dropped the game 34-27, but had a huge swing of momentum heading into the 2018 season. Kennesaw State finished the season ranked 8th in the FCS STATS Poll (highest media poll in the FCS) and 9th in the coaches poll.

The 2018 season saw The Owls open at 5th in both polls, the highest in program history. Kennesaw lost its third straight season opener, a tough road loss to nearby Georgia State University. It was the program's first game against an FBS team and ended with a 24-20 loss at GA State Stadium (formally Turner Field). After the hiccup the Owls did not look back, winning 11 games in a row. After a 56-17 road win against Gardner-Webb, Kennesaw was voted to the Number 2 spot in both the FCS STATS and Coach's Polls, behind only North Dakota State. Just like 2017, Kennesaw finished 5-0 in the Big South winning a second consecutive conference championship. That made the Owls the first team to win the conference outright in back to back season since former member Liberty did so in 2007 and 2008. The regular season was completed with an instant classic against Jacksonville State at SunTrust Park. A five overtime shootout ending in a 60-52 owl victory is now regarded as the most exciting in school history. Holding a 10-1 regular season record, Kennesaw received a first round bye as the 4th seed in the FCS Playoffs. In the second round the Owls hosted the Wofford College Terriers, winning 13-10. The Owls lost in the quarterfinals for the second year in a row the following week at home against South Dakota State. Kennesaw finished the season ranked 5th in the FCS STATS poll and 4th in the coaches poll, the best in the short history.

At the conclusion of the 2019 season that saw Kennesaw go 11-3, the Owls tallied a 48-15 total record from the start of the program. That put the Owls as the winningest startup football program through the first five years of playing football.

Conference championships

Year-by-year results
Statistics correct as of the end of the 2019–20 college football season

*The 2020 FCS Season was played in the Spring of 2021 due to the COVID-19 Pandemic.

Playoff results
The Owls have appeared in the NCAA Division I Football Championship playoffs four times. Their record is 5–4.

Future non-conference opponents 
Opponents after the 2023 season subject to change due to the Owls' move to FBS.

References

External links
 

 
American football teams established in 2015
2015 establishments in Georgia (U.S. state)

es:Kennesaw State Owls